Oban Lorne may refer to:

Oban Lorn Shinty Club, a shinty club from Oban
Oban Lorn Ladies Shinty Club, a Women's shinty club from Oban
Oban Lorne RFC. a rugby union team from Oban